William Miller Allen (7 July 1889 – 13 November 1948) was an Australian rules footballer who played for Melbourne in the Victorian Football League (VFL).

Allen was a ruckman and played during a dour period for the club. He was with Melbourne from 1910 to 1923 but missed the 1916, 1917 and 1918 seasons due to the war. During the summer of 1914–15 he played a couple of first class cricket matches for Victoria in the Sheffield Shield.

See also
 List of Victoria first-class cricketers

References

Cricinfo profile
DemonWiki profile

1889 births
1948 deaths
Melbourne Football Club players
South Yarra Football Club players
Australian cricketers
Victoria cricketers
Australian rules footballers from Melbourne
Cricketers from Victoria (Australia)
Australian rules footballers from Ballarat